Josef Jánský (born 24 November 1940) is a Czech long-distance runner. He competed in the marathon at the 1980 Summer Olympics.

References

External links
 

1940 births
Living people
Athletes (track and field) at the 1972 Summer Olympics
Athletes (track and field) at the 1980 Summer Olympics
Czech male long-distance runners
Czech male marathon runners
Olympic athletes of Czechoslovakia
People from Strakonice
Sportspeople from the South Bohemian Region